Glendambo is a town and locality in the Australian state of South Australia located on the Stuart Highway about  from the state capital of Adelaide and about  from Coober Pedy.

The town was constituted on 13 May 1982 and was derived from the Glendambo Homestead. Boundaries for the locality were established on 23 October 2003 and include both the homestead and the Government Town of Glendambo.

As of 2004, the locality was described as follows:Located 592 km from Adelaide and 186 km north of Port Augusta on the Stuart Highway, Glendambo is an important stopping point on the Stuart Highway as, if you are travelling north, there are no more facilities for 254 km until you reach Coober Pedy. With a population of around 30 people and an annual rainfall of only 185 mm it will never grow into a major centre. It is a comprehensive roadside stopping point with a caravan park, a hotel-motel, a licensed restaurant, roadhouse and general store.

At the 2016 census, Glendambo had no people living within its boundaries.

Glendambo is located within the federal Division of Grey, the state electoral district of Giles, the Pastoral Unincorporated Area of South Australia and the state's Far North region. In the absence of a local government authority, the community in Glendambo receives municipal services from a state government agency, the Outback Communities Authority.

References

External links 
Travel Guide archived 27 September 2007

Towns in South Australia
Far North (South Australia)
Places in the unincorporated areas of South Australia